Acuity International, formerly Caliburn International LLC, is a professional services provider headquartered in Reston, Virginia, with approximately 8,500 employees. They offer engineering, environmental, and technical solutions; logistics; risk management; construction; and consulting activities, as well as medical and humanitarian services.  They serve the U.S. government and commercial clients worldwide, including the Department of Defense and Department of State. The company was formed by DC Capital Partners and is currently managed by James Van Dusen, former Chief Financial Officer of Comprehensive Health Services. The board includes Generals John Kelly, Anthony C. Zinni, Michael Hayden, and admirals Stephen F. Loftus, and Kathleen Martin. Retired Admiral James G. Stavridis previously served on the board and resigned in September 2019. Caliburn's Chief Strategy Officer and Executive Vice President for Corporate Development for is retired Vice Admiral Frank Craig Pandolfe.

Stock market 
In October 2018, the company announced plans to sell $100 million shares public stocks in an initial public offering, promising significant growth related to Trump's immigration and border policies, however warning potential investors of risks related to the "politically charged environment." Caliburn withdrew its registration statement for the offering in March 2019 following negative press and scrutiny. The prospectus included an annual payment of at least $100,000 for board members and $200,000 bonus if the company went public.

Criticisms 
Caliburn has received scrutiny for operations by subsidiary companies Sallyport Global and Comprehensive Health Services The company is being investigated for alleged bribery of Iraqi officials for exclusive contracts. As of May 2019, a non-partisan watchdog group, Citizens for Responsibility and Ethics in Washington, requested documentation regarding Kelly's involvement with Trump's child separation policy and current role at Caliburn. Comprehensive Health Services also operated at Balad Air Base during the time that Sallyport Global is accused of worker mistreatment and neglect.

References

External links
Caliburn International

Business services companies established in 2018